This is a list of stadiums with at least a 45,000 capacity that include facilities for track and field events:

See also 

 List of sports venues by capacity
 List of stadiums
 List of future stadiums

References 

Track and field